Therm-a-Rest is an American outdoor product company specializing in camping mattresses, sleeping bags, camp chairs, cots, and pillows. Therm-a-Rest began as a line of self-inflating camping mattresses, invented in the early-1970s by two former Boeing engineers and avid backpackers. The company was initially named Cascade Designs, which is now the parent company of Therm-a-Rest and other outdoor brands.

Product 

A Therm-a-Rest self-inflating mattress consists of an airtight nylon fabric envelope filled with a sheet of low density, open-cell polyurethane foam. When a valve is opened the foam expands and draws air into the mattress. When the mattress has fully inflated, the user simply closes the valve. To increase firmness a few breaths of air can be blown into the mattress. To pack the mattress the valve is opened and it is rolled up tightly to force the air out, whereupon the valve is closed to prevent re-inflation.

References

External links
Therm-a-Rest site
Cascade Designs site

1971 establishments in Washington (state)
Camping equipment
Manufacturing companies based in Seattle
Manufacturing companies established in 1971
Mattress retailers of the United States
Climbing and mountaineering equipment companies